Discocactus bahiensis is a species of Discocactus from Brazil.

References

External links
 
 

bahiensis
Flora of Brazil
Plants described in 1922